KhK Fakel Bogdanovich is a bandy club in Bogdanovich, Russia. The club has earlier been playing in the Russian Bandy Supreme League, the second-tier of Russian bandy. The home games are played at Stadium Fakel in Bogdanovich. The club took part in Russian league play from 1992 and its colours are red and blue.

The club withdrew from regular league play in 2012 due to a lack of funding.

References

Bandy clubs in Russia
Sport in Sverdlovsk Oblast
Bandy clubs established in 1992
1992 establishments in Russia